William F. Powers (born 1940) is a former vice president of research for the Ford Motor Company. In 1992 he was elected a Foreign Member of the Royal Swedish Academy of Engineering Sciences.

Powers earned his bachelor's degree at the University of Florida, then a master's degree in engineering in 1966 and a Ph.D. in engineering in 1968 from the University of Texas at Austin. He was with Ford Motor Company from 1979 until 2000. He was with NASA in the 1960s. 

He was elected a member of the National Academy of Engineering in 1993 for leadership in advancing research and development of automotive technology.

References

University of Texas at Austin alumni page of Powers

Ford executives
American manufacturing businesspeople
University of Florida alumni
Members of the Royal Swedish Academy of Engineering Sciences
1940 births
Living people
Members of the United States National Academy of Engineering
University of Texas at Austin alumni